Sphenotoma is a genus of flowering plants belonging to the family Ericaceae.

Its native range is Southwestern Australia.

Species:

Sphenotoma capitata 
Sphenotoma dracophylloides 
Sphenotoma drummondii 
Sphenotoma gracilis 
Sphenotoma parviflora 
Sphenotoma squarrosa

References

Epacridoideae
Ericaceae genera